Huanghuagang is a subdistrict of the Yuexiu District in Guangzhou City, Guangdong Province, southern China.

See also
 Second Guangzhou Uprising

References 

Administrative divisions of Yuexiu District